Ian Clark may refer to:

Ian Clark (basketball) (born 1991), American basketball player
Ian Clark (director)  English film director
Ian Clark (footballer) (born 1974), English former professional footballer
Ian Clark (geologist)  professor in the Department of Earth Sciences at the University of Ottawa, Canada
Ian Clark (speedway rider) (born 1958), English speedway rider
Ian Clark (rugby union) (born 1992), English rugby union player
Ian D. Clark (civil servant) (born 1946), former Canadian civil servant and Order of Canada Recipient
Ian D. Clark (historian) (born 1958), Associate Professor of Tourism at University of Ballarat, researcher of Victorian Aboriginal history
Ian Clark (actor), British actor cast in The Avengers
Ian D. Clark (actor) (born 1949/1950), Yorkshire born Canadian actor in Road to Avonlea, The Hunt for the Unicorn Killer or The Arrow

See also
Ian Clarke (disambiguation)